AHS may refer to:

Schools

Adelaide High School, Adelaide, Australia
Aitkin High School, Minnesota, USA
Agoura High School, Agoura Hills, USA
Albemarle High School (Virginia), USA
Alice High School, Texas, USA
Allen High School (disambiguation), various schools
Alternative High School (Calgary), Alberta, Canada
Ames High School, Iowa, USA
Amsterdam High School, New York, USA
Andrean High School, Indiana, USA
Anglican High School (disambiguation), various schools
Annandale High School, Virginia, USA
Ashland High School (disambiguation), various schools
Austin High School (disambiguation), various schools
Aylesbury High School, Buckinghamshire, UK
Ancaster High School, Ontario, Canada
Amesbury High School, Massachusetts, U.S.A.
Ajax High School, Ajax, Ontario, Canada

Societies
American Headache Society, of professional headache specialists
American Helicopter Society International
American Hiking Society
American Horticultural Society
Antiquarian Horological Society, UK
Arizona Historical Society, USA
Abertay Historical Society, Scotland
National Federation of Atheist, Humanist and Secular Student Societies, UK

Health-related
Academy of Health Sciences, US Army
Adventist Health Studies, of Seventh-day Adventists
Alameda Health System, of Alameda County, California
Alberta Health Services, a provincial health authority in Alberta, Canada
Atlantic Health System, a New Jersey health care network

Other uses
African horse sickness, affecting equines
Alien hand syndrome, a neurological disorder affecting the hands
American Horror Story, an American television series
American Horror Stories, an spin-off of the American television series
American Housing Survey, a statistical survey
Ashurst (Kent) railway station, England (National Rail code)
Australian Hospital Ship, prefix
Automated highway system or Smart Road, for driverless cars

See also

 
 
 AH (disambiguation)
 HS (disambiguation)